The 2006 Banka Koper Slovenia Open was a women's tennis tournament played on outdoor hard courts. It was the 2nd edition of the Slovenia Open, and was part of the WTA Tier IV tournaments of the 2006 women's professional tennis season. It was held in Portorož, Slovenia, from 18 September until 24 September 2006. Unseeded Tamira Paszek, who entered the competition as a qualifier, won the singles title.

Points and prize money

Point distribution

Prize money

* per team

Finals

Singles 

 Tamira Paszek defeated  Maria Elena Camerin, 7–5, 6–1
 Paszek won the first title of her career. She became the youngest tour singles titlist in 2006, and the seventh-youngest of all-time.

Doubles 

 Lucie Hradecká /  Renata Voráčová claimed the title, when  Eva Birnerová /  Émilie Loit withdrew before the final.

References

External links 
 ITF Singles draw

Banka Koper Slovenia Open
Banka Koper Slovenia Open
2006 in Slovenian tennis